Michele Waagaard (Thai มิเชล วอกอร์ด, born 1980) is a Norwegian-Thai model, pop star, actress, MTV VJ, and radio host. In 1995 she won the title as Model of the Year for the Thai teen magazine The Boy.

Michele studied at Bangkok Patana School and has a degree in Communication Arts from Assumption University. In 1996 she landed a record deal with Grammy Entertainment in Thailand.  Michele and 7 other teenagers released the album Teen 8 Grade A. After a year on the road the four girls in the band came together and created Thailand's first pop girl band JAMP, Jennifer, Anna, Michele and Por. JAMP released two albums JAMP and Bungorn ao tae dance. After several years of touring the girls split up and went their separate ways in 2001.

Michele became a full-time catwalk model. In 2002 Michele became a VJ for MTV Thailand. She hosted MTV POP with Rowena Kennett and MTV ROCK. Michele was also briefly in Los Angeles to attend the Lee Strasberg Institute. In 2005 she moved back to her birth country Norway, to host and produce a daily music show SVISJ SHOW for the national broadcasting network NRK. Coinciding with also attending Noroff Institute studying Film and TV production.
In December 2008, Michele hosted the fourth annual GBOB Challenge (the Global Battle of the Bands World Finals) in central London.

From 2010 to 2012 Michele moved on to work for a Bangkok local radio station WAVE FM 88, hosting the morning show and weekend show.

Since 2012, Michele retracted from the spotlight and went into corporate where she has been working in the content field. Currently, she is living in Berlin.

References

Citations
 https://www.vg.no/rampelys/tv/i/QlRLoQ/fra-mtv-til-nrk2
 https://www.ringblad.no/in-puls/michele-sikter-pa-stjernene/s/1-97-566083
 https://www.dagbladet.no/kultur/norske-michele-stjerne-i-thailand/65708016
 https://www.dagbladet.no/kultur/michele-fra-mtv-til-hollywood/65873635

1980 births
Living people
People from Ringerike (municipality)
Michele Waagaard
Norwegian female models
Michele Waagaard
VJs (media personalities)
Michele Waagaard
Michele Waagaard
Norwegian people of Thai descent
21st-century Norwegian women singers
21st-century Norwegian singers
Michele Waagaard
Michele Waagaard